Piers Flanagan (born 31 March 1992) is a professional Australian rules football player at the Gold Coast Football Club in the Australian Football League (AFL). He was recruited by the club as an underage priority pick in 2010. He made his debut in Round 21, 2012, against  at the Melbourne Cricket Ground.

Statistics
 

|- style="background-color: #EAEAEA"
! scope="row" style="text-align:center" | 2012
|
| 15 || 3 || 0 || 0 || 12 || 8 || 20 || 5 || 5 || 0.0 || 0.0 || 4.0 || 2.7 || 6.7 || 1.7 || 1.7
|- class="sortbottom"
! colspan=3| Career
! 3
! 0
! 0
! 12
! 8
! 20
! 5
! 5
! 0.0
! 0.0
! 4.0
! 2.7
! 6.7
! 1.7
! 1.7
|}

References

External links
Piers Flanagan Player Profile, Gold Coast SUNS
 

1992 births
Living people
Gold Coast Football Club players
Australian rules footballers from Victoria (Australia)
Geelong Falcons players
Sandringham Football Club players
People educated at Geelong College